Catterson is a surname. Notable people with the surname include:

Eileen Catterson, Scottish fashion model and former Miss Scotland
James M. Catterson, Associate Justice of the New York Appellate Division of the Supreme Court, First Judicial Department
Robert Francis Catterson (1835–1914), American physician and soldier
Tom Catterson (1884–1920), professional baseball player who played outfield from 1908 to 1909 for the Brooklyn Superbas